Hyloconis lespedezae is a moth of the family Gracillariidae. It is known from Japan (the islands of Hokkaido, Honshu and Kyushu), Korea and the Russian Far East.

The wingspan is 6.5–7 mm.

The larvae feed as leaf miners on Lespedeza bicolor. The mine is orthogenous, entirely flat and located on the lower surface of the leaf. The cocoon is white and orbicular in form and is spun in the centre of the mine-cavity.

References

Lithocolletinae
Moths of Japan

Moths described in 1963
Leaf miners
Moths of Korea
Insects of Russia
Taxa named by Tosio Kumata
Moths of Asia